Toni Aliaj (born 6 January 1999) is a Croatian footballer who plays as a defender for Tabor Sežana.

Club career
In 2018, Aliaj signed for Tabor Sežana in the Slovenian top flight from the youth academy of Italian Serie A side Lazio. He was found guilty and admitted the use of cocaine, which is a banned substance on the doping list, after a game in August 2019.

Before the second half of 2019/20, Aliaj temporarily returned to Croatia from Tabor Sežana due to heart problems.

References

External links
 Toni Aliaj at playmakerstats.com

1999 births
Living people
People from Seraing
Belgian people of Albanian descent
Croatian people of Albanian descent
Association football defenders
Croatian footballers
NK Tabor Sežana players
Slovenian Second League players
Slovenian PrvaLiga players
Croatian expatriate footballers
Expatriate footballers in Italy
Croatian expatriate sportspeople in Italy
Expatriate footballers in Slovenia
Croatian expatriate sportspeople in Slovenia